Morven Parish is a civil parish of County of Napier, a county in the central western part of New South Wales, Australia.

The parish is in Warrumbungle Shire and the only town of the parish is Morven.

References

Localities in New South Wales
Geography of New South Wales
Central West (New South Wales)